Athletes from the Kingdom of Serbs, Croats and Slovenes competed at the 1920 Summer Olympics in Antwerp. Yugoslavia debuted at the Olympic Games participating in every edition of the Summer Olympics ever since. Eleven Yugoslav athletes participated in Belgium: only the football team – without the substitutes.

Football

Yugoslavia competed in the Olympic football tournament for the first time. It lost both of its matches.

 Team roster
Andrija Kojić
Nikola Simić
Dragutin Vrđuka
Vjekoslav Župančić
Jaroslav Šifer
Stanko Tavčar
Slavin Cindrić
Rudolf Rupec
Dragutin Vragović
Artur Dubravčić
Branimir Porobić
Emil Perška
Ivan Granec
Jovan Ružić
Josip Šolc

 First round

 Consolation first round

Final rank 14th

References
Official Olympic Reports
International Olympic Committee results database

Nations at the 1920 Summer Olympics
1920
Olympics